The 20th Grey Cup was played on December 3, 1932, before 4,806 fans at the Civic Stadium at Hamilton.

The Hamilton Tigers defeated the Regina Roughriders 25–6.

External links
 
 

Grey Cup
Grey Cups hosted in Hamilton, Ontario
Grey Cup
1932 in Ontario
December 1932 sports events
20th century in Hamilton, Ontario
Saskatchewan Roughriders
December 1932 events in North America